Salla Qullu (Aymara salla steep ridge or boulders, qullu mountain, Hispanicized spelling Salla Kkollu, Salla Khollu) is a  mountain in the Cordillera Occidental in the Andes of Bolivia. It is situated in the Oruro Department, Sajama Province, Turco Municipality, Chachacomani Canton, south-east of the mountain Capurata and the Acotango volcano and south of the Bolivian Route 4 that leads to Tambo Quemado on the border with Chile.

See also
 Kuntur Ikiña
 Umurata
 Wallatiri
 Sajama National Park
 Wila Qullu
 List of mountains in the Andes

References 

Mountains of Oruro Department